Kofi Antubam (1922 – 1964) was a Ghanaian artist and designer whose works of art depict understated aspect of community life in Ghana, his designs include state regalia such as the presidential mace and presidential seat used by Kwame Nkrumah. Antubam pioneered the use of adinkra symbols in Ghanaian art. He was appointed a state artist by Kwame Nkrumah.

He was the author of the book Ghana's Heritage of Culture. In 1962, some of his works were exhibited in New York by the American Society of African Culture.

Life 
Antubam was born in 1922 to the family of Maame and Nana Mensah. His father died when Antubam was at a young age, thereafter his uncle took him to Kumasi to start his education. He later spent some time in Jos, Nigeria, and also at Adisadel College. It was while at Adisadel College that he was encouraged to develop his craft. The principal, Father John Knight suggested to the governor, Arnold Hodson to commission the young Antubam to make a clay bust. After favorable reception of the sculpted work, he obtained sponsorship to attend Achimota College. At Achimota College, he was a pupil of a Russian-born sculptor and art teacher, Herbert Vladimir Meyerowitz, a teacher who encouraged his students to  absorb everyday community life as inspiration and not just copying European art traditions. Antubam's years at Achimota included completing an arts and craft course, teacher training course and a primary course. After graduation, Antubam supported himself through teaching, he also produced and sold figurative paintings. Between 1948 and 1950, he won a scholarship to study at Goldsmith College, London.

In the 1950s, Antubam developed various works of arts and craft including Nkrumah's presidential mace and chair, various state commissioned relief mural carvings.

In 1963, he published Ghana's Heritage of Culture, a book that treats Ghana's contribution to the world of art and a medium Antubam used to make a case for a national art that represents Ghana's political and cultural history.

References 

1922 births
1964 deaths
Ghanaian artists
Ghanaian expatriates in the United Kingdom